Broadwell Lake, sometimes called Broadwell Dry Lake, is a dry lake bed in the Mojave Desert of San Bernardino County, California,  east of Barstow.

Solar power site
BrightSource Energy Inc. had proposed a solar power-generation project near Broadwell Lake, but withdrew that proposal in 2009.

Wilderness Area
The east side of Broadwell Lake is Federally designated Wilderness and lies within the Bureau of Land Management Kelso Dunes Wilderness Area.

See also
 List of lakes in California

References

External links
 BLM - Kelso Dunes Wilderness Area: Photo Gallery
 Google Maps Satellite Photo - Broadwell Lake
 BLM: Wilderness Area Map

Endorheic lakes of California
Lakes of the Mojave Desert
Lakes of San Bernardino County, California
Bureau of Land Management areas in California
Protected areas of the Mojave Desert
Solar power in the Mojave Desert
Protected areas of San Bernardino County, California
Lakes of California
Lakes of Southern California